{{DISPLAYTITLE:C12H10O6}}
The molecular formula C12H10O6 (molar mass: 250.20 g/mol, exact mass: 250.0477 u) may refer to:

 Difucol, a phlorotannin
 Diphlorethol, a phlorotannin